The Regulating Act of 1773 (formally, the East India Company Act 1772) was an Act of the Parliament of Great Britain intended to overhaul the management of the East India Company's rule in India. The Act did not prove to be a long-term solution to concerns over the company's affairs; Pitt's India Act was therefore subsequently enacted in 1784 as a more radical reform. It marked the first step towards parliamentary control over the company and centralised administration in India.

Background
By 1773, the East India Company was in dire financial straits. The company was important to the British Empire because it was a monopoly trading company in India and in the east and many influential people were shareholders. The Company paid  (the present-day (2015) equivalent is £) annually to the government to maintain the monopoly but had been unable to meet its commitments since 1768 because of the loss of tea sales to America. About 85% of all the tea in America was smuggled Dutch tea. The East India Company owed money to both the Bank of England and the government: it had 15 million lbs ( million kg) of tea rotting in British warehouses and more en route from India. The Regulating Act 1773, was complemented by the Tea Act 1773, which had a principal objective that was to reduce the massive amount of tea held by the financially troubled British East India Company in its London warehouses and to help the financially struggling company survive.

Lord North decided to overhaul the management of the India Company with the Regulating Act. This was the first step to the eventual government control of India. The Act set up a system whereby it supervised (regulated) the work of the East India Company.

The company had taken over large areas of India for trading purposes and had an army to protect its interests. Company men were not trained to govern so North's government began moves towards government control since India was of national importance. Shareholders in the Company opposed the Act. The East India Company was still a powerful lobbying group in Parliament in spite of its financial problems.

Provisions of the Regulating Act
The Act limited  Company dividends to 6% until it repaid a  loan (passed by an accompanying act, 13 Geo. 3 c. 64) and restricted the Court of Directors to four-year terms.
First step taken by the British government to regulate and control the company's affairs in India.
It prohibited the servants of company from engaging in any private trade or accepting presents or bribes from the "natives".
The Act elevated Governor of Bengal, Warren Hastings to Governor-General of Bengal and subsumed the presidencies of Madras and Bombay under Bengal's control. It laid the foundations for a centralized administration in India. Governor of Bengal became the Governor General of Bengal with an executive council of four to assist him. Decisions would be taken by majority and Governor General  could only vote in case of tie.
The Act named four additional men to serve with the Governor-General on the Supreme Council of Bengal: Lt-Gen John Clavering, George Monson, Richard Barwell, and Philip Francis.
A Supreme Court was established at Fort William at Calcutta(1774). British judges were to be sent to India to administer the British legal system that was used there.
Establishment of Supreme Court at Calcutta with Sir Elijah Impey as first chief justice. Court has both the Civil and criminal jurisdiction. With original & appelate jurisdiction.
It has permitted the company to keep back its territorial possession in India. It has not given the complete power to company hence called as regulating act. Ultimately, we can conclude that it was the first step towards parliamentary control over the company.

See also
East India Company Act
Pitt's India Act
Government of India Act 1858

References

Notes

Great Britain Acts of Parliament 1773
Legislation in British India
British East India Company